George Glenn "Farmer" Bell  (November 2, 1874 – December 25, 1941) was a pitcher in Major League Baseball. He pitched with the Brooklyn Dodgers for 5 seasons.

External links

1874 births
1941 deaths
Baseball players from New York (state)
Major League Baseball pitchers
Brooklyn Superbas players
Brooklyn Dodgers players
Altoona Mountaineers players
Newark Indians players
Syracuse Stars (minor league baseball) players
Warren Bingoes players
Amsterdam-Gloversville-Johnstown Hyphens players
Amsterdam-Gloversville-Johnstown Jags players